Laguna Negra is the Spanish translation for "black lagoon". It may refer to:
 Laguna Negra, a lake in Catamarca Province, Argentina
 Laguna Negra, a lagoon in Rocha Department, Uruguay